13th Street is a German pay television channel owned by the NBCUniversal subsidiary of Comcast through its NBCUniversal International Networks division. The channel is devoted to the genres thriller & crime and shows series, feature films as well as short films.

13th Street is also promotes young directors. The station awards the short film prize Shocking Shorts Award every year as part of the Munich Film Festival (Filmfest München) and has co-financed nearly 40 short films.

History
As part of repositioning of NBC/Universal channels, 13th Street was renamed 13th Street Universal on 14 March 2011.

Programming

Airwolf (2001-2002, 2004–2005)
American Crime (2015–present)
Body of Proof (2017–present)
Broadchurch (2015, 2017–present)
Bull (2017–present)
Cape Town (2016–present)
Chance (2017–present)
Chosen (2015-2016, 2018–present)
Criminal Minds (2010–present)
Criminal Minds: Suspect Behavior (Criminal Minds: Team Red) (2013–present)
Culpa - Niemand ist ohne Schuld (2017–present)
Dead Again (Dead Again - Auf Mörderjagd) (2016–present)
Dragnet (Polizeibericht) (2006-2009)
Gourmet Detective (Mord à la carte) (2016–present)
Human Trafficking (Frauenhandel - Kampf gegen das Kartell) (2014–present)
Intelligence (2014–2016)
Jane Doe (Deckname Jane Doe) (2014–present)
Kojak (1999–2004, 2006–2009)
Law & Order True Crime (2018–present)
Law & Order: Trial by Jury (2017–present)
McBride (Ein Fall für McBride) (2014–present)
NCIS (Navy CIS) (2009–present)
NCIS: Los Angeles (Navy CIS: L.A.) (2011–present)
Numbers (Numb3rs - Die Logik des Verbrechens) (2011–present)
Perry Mason (2016–present)
Prime Suspect (Heißer Verdacht) (2007-2010)
Republic of Doyle (Republic of Doyle - Einsatz für zwei) (2013-2015)
Slasher (2016–present)
Stonemouth (Stonemouth - Stadt ohne Gewissen) (2016–present)
T. J. Hooker (2007-2008)
Tatort (2007-2009)
The Art of More (The Art of More - Tödliche Gier) (2016–present)
The Loch (Loch Ness) (2017–present)
Thorne (Tom Thorne) (2015–present)

Distribution
13th Street is available in Germany, Austria and Switzerland via the pay-TV package Sky as well as in Germany via the digital program offerings of cable operators Kabel Deutschland, Unitymedia, Tele Columbus and Primacom as well as the digital package of the Kabelkiosk. In addition, 13th Street can be received via the IPTV offer Telekom Entertain and Vodafone. In Switzerland, the channel can be received via the cable network operator UPC Switzerland, with numerous smaller cable network operators as well as via the program platform Teleclub, in Austria via UPC Austria and A1 TV.

Since 19 July 2011, the station broadcasts in HD standard at Kabel Deutschland, Unitymedia was unveiled on 15 March 2012. Since 17 January 2013, the HD version can be received via the Sky Deutschland platform.

Audience share

Germany

References

External links
 

NBCUniversal networks
Television channels and stations established in 1998
1998 establishments in Germany
Television stations in Germany
Television stations in Austria
Television stations in Switzerland
German-language television stations
Mass media in Munich